Rotimi Williams is a farmer and former journalist. He owns Kereksuk Rice Farm in Nassarawa State which is the second largest commercial rice farm in Nigeria by land size.

His farm, which is situated in Nasarawa state in northern Nigeria, currently sits on 45,000 hectares and employs more than 600 natives of Nasarawa

Education 
He attended King's College, Lagos. He studied Economics at the University of Aberdeen, Scotland and has a master's degree in Economics from the same institution. He proceeded to the School of Oriental and African Studies (SOAS), where he obtained a master's degree in Finance and Development Studies.

Career 
He was an analyst at the European Economics and Financial Centre in London in 2007. He moved on to be an African contributor at Euromoney Magazine in 2008. He moved on to work at First City Monument Bank in 2008 where he said his concerns for the agricultural sector started growing as the bank would not adopt policies and gain inroads into the agricultural industry. He left in 2010 to start Kereksuk's 45,000 hectares rice farm in 2012.

References

Nigerian farmers
Nigerian journalists
Year of birth missing (living people)
Living people
Yoruba farmers
King's College, Lagos alumni
Alumni of the University of Aberdeen
Alumni of SOAS University of London
Yoruba businesspeople